The 2022 Ostrava municipal election was held on 23 and  24 September 2022 as part of the nationwide municipal elections. ANO 2011 has won the third election in row.

Background
Previous election was held in 2018. ANO 2011 won the election with Tomáš Macura being reelected as the Mayor. ANO formed coalition with ODS, KDU-ČSL and Pirates. Macura decided to run for reelection in 2022. ODS, KDU-ČSL and TOP 09 decided to run under Spolu alliance banner with Jan Dohnal as electoral leader. Ostravak is once again led by Lukáš Semerák.

Opinion polls

Result

References

2022
2022 elections in the Czech Republic